"Queen of Hearts" (Roud 3195) is a song sung by, among others, Joan Baez and Martin Carthy.

The lyrics are from a traditional song.
To the Queen of Hearts is the Ace of Sorrow, 
He's here today and he's gone tomorrow. 
Young men are plenty but sweethearts few; 
If my love leave me, what shall I do?

Joan Baez version
It was released as the B-Side of Baez' "Farewell Angelina", a Bob Dylan song, on Fontana Records in 1965. In The Joan Baez Ballad Book it is said to be traditional, though elsewhere erroneously attributed to David Coverdale and Micky Moody

References

1965 songs
Joan Baez songs